Ageratina lemmonii,  called the Lemmon's snakeroot, is a North American species of plants in the family Asteraceae. It is found only in the southwestern United States in the states of Arizona and New Mexico, as well as the states of Sonora, Sinaloa, Chihuahua and Durango in Mexico.

Etymology
Ageratina is derived from Greek meaning 'un-aging', in reference to the flowers keeping their color for a long time. This name was used by Dioscorides for a number of different plants.

The species is named for John Gill Lemmon (1831–1908), husband of botanist Sara Plummer Lemmon (1836–1923).

References

lemmonii
Flora of Arizona
Plants described in 1892
Flora of Northwestern Mexico
Flora of Northeastern Mexico